The 1976 American League Championship Series was a best-of-five playoff pitting the New York Yankees against the Kansas City Royals for the American League pennant and the right to represent the American League in the 1976 World Series. The Yankees defeated the Royals in five games to advance to win their first pennant in twelve years.

Chris Chambliss would cap a memorable series with the first ever walk-off home run to end a League Championship Series, a feat not matched again for 27 years.

Summary

New York Yankees vs. Kansas City Royals

Game summaries

Game 1

The opener was played on a bright Saturday afternoon at Royals Stadium and pitted Yankee ace Jim "Catfish" Hunter against left-hander and ex-Yankee Larry Gura. The Yankees got off to a quick start, scoring two in the first aided by a pair of George Brett throwing errors. Hunter was in top form and went the distance, not going to a three-ball count the entire game. While the Royals were able to halve that margin going into the ninth, Roy White's two-run double in the top of the frame gave the Yanks two insurance runs that were the final scoring in a tidy 4–1 win.

Game 2

Five Yankee errors helped key the Royals series-tying win. Lefty Paul Splittorff was solid with  innings of work in relief of Brooklyn native Dennis Leonard, while Yankee reliever Dick Tidrow was ineffective and permitted three more Kansas City runs to score in the eighth after relieving starter Ed Figueroa with one out in the sixth. The series, now tied at one, moved to New York and newly remodelled Yankee Stadium for the remaining three games.

Game 3

The first Yankee post-season home game since 1964 started ominously for the Bombers, as the Royals tagged righty Dock Ellis for three runs in the first. He settled down immediately after though and went eight solid innings, aided by several double plays and two base runners caught stealing. The Yankees narrowed the margin to one in the fourth on a Chris Chambliss two-run homer off Andy Hassler and then tacked on three more in the sixth, as Kansas City manager Whitey Herzog carted in four relievers in that inning alone. Sparky Lyle got the save by pitching a scoreless ninth inning, as the Bronx Bombers took a two games to one lead.

Game 4

Hoping to wrap up the series in four games, Yankee manager Billy Martin brought back Catfish Hunter on three days' rest while the Royals did the same, bringing back Larry Gura. Neither fared well, as Gura gave up six hits and two runs in two innings, while Hunter lasted three and surrendered five runs on five hits. The Yankee offense was highlighted by Graig Nettles' two homers and three RBI. The series was then knotted at two, with a deciding Game 5 to be played the next night.

Game 5

The deciding game was a fitting ending to a thrilling series, as both teams fought tooth and nail to bring home the AL flag. It culminated in a moment of sheer, unbridled joy for the winners and stunned disbelief for the losers. The Yankees started Ed Figueroa on three days rest, as the Royals did likewise, starting Dennis Leonard. The Royals jumped out on top in the first, as Brett doubled and scored on John Mayberry's two-run homer. The Yankees quickly countered in their half, with Mickey Rivers tripling and scoring on Roy White's infield single.  White went to third after Thurman Munson singled. Herzog removed Leonard and brought in Game 2 winner Paul Splittorff, who limited the damage by allowing only Chambliss' sacrifice fly. The Royals countered with one in the second, but the Yanks jumped ahead in the third, as they tacked on two; one on a Munson single and the other on a Chambliss' ground out. The Yanks added on in the sixth, scoring twice; once on a Munson single and a second time on a Brett throwing error. Figueroa held that lead going into the eighth. After Al Cowens led off with a single, Billy Martin brought in lefty Grant Jackson. He allowed a single to pinch hitter Jim Wohlford. Brett then stunned the sell-out crowd of 56,821 by planting Jackson's second pitch just over the short right-field wall, tying the game at six. All this was a prelude to the bottom of the ninth inning, when, at 11:43 pm, Chris Chambliss turned on Kansas City reliever Mark Littell's first pitch and sent it over the right center field wall. Thousands of fans vaulted over the dugouts and walls and celebrated the Yankees' first pennant in 12 years. Chambliss reached second, then dodged hordes of spectators in trying to reach third. He then proceeded to make a beeline towards the safety of the clubhouse, as the area around home plate and much of the field was covered with celebrating fans. Some time later, Chambliss was escorted back out onto the field to touch home, but the plate had been stolen. He touched the area where the plate had been. He was later informed by the umpires that given the circumstances of the situation, they would have counted the run regardless.

Composite box
1976 ALCS (3–2): New York Yankees over Kansas City Royals

Aftermath
Chambliss was later cornered in the Yankee locker room by Graig Nettles, who asked him if he had touched home. Chambliss responded that he had not, because there were too many people in the way. Nettles then told him that home plate umpire Art Frantz was waiting for him out on the field for him to touch home so that the home run could be ruled official. Chambliss was then escorted out to the field and touched the area where home had been.

Kansas City manager Whitey Herzog did not attempt to contest the home run, although major league rules state that a player must touch all the bases on any hit or when running the bases. In this case, the mayhem on the field made that task impossible, and the magnitude of the game was such that Herzog would have never tried to have it restarted or protested it due to a technicality. As mentioned above, the umpires had already decided that his home run counted.

As a result, MLB amended rule 4.09 calling it "The Chris Chambliss Rule" 
The exception states: Rule 4.09(b) Comment: An exception will be if fans rush onto the field and physically prevent the runner from touching home plate or the batter from touching first base. In such cases, the umpires shall award the runner the base because of the obstruction by the fans. This had the effect of codifying the decision the umpires made in Game 5.

Brett's home run was the first of nine that he hit in ALCS competition. Six of those came against the Yankees: one in 1976, three in 1978, and two in 1980. His other three ALCS home runs, which came in the 1985 ALCS, were all against one pitcher, Doyle Alexander of the Blue Jays. Alexander was a Yankee in 1976. He warmed up in the bullpen during Game 5, and started the first game of the World Series for them against the Cincinnati Reds.

The series also contained some interesting side stories. Kansas City pitcher Larry Gura publicly criticized Yankee manager Billy Martin prior to the series, saying that Martin treated him shabbily in the short time Martin was his manager in New York. Gura was on the Yankees' roster from spring training till the time he was traded to Kansas City on May 16. He did not appear in any games for the Yankees in that time. Martin responded by saying that if he had him there with the Yankees at that moment, he'd get rid of him again. George Brett also had harsh words for Martin, as he claimed that Martin had lied to his brother, pitcher Ken Brett, when Ken spent the first two months of 1976 with the Yanks. George's brother appeared in two games for the Yankees over two months, and was then traded to the Chicago White Sox.

This was the first of three consecutive ALCS between the two teams. They also went head to head in 1977 and 1978, with the Yankees coming out on top again.  The Royals, however, exacted a big measure of revenge when they met again in the 1980 ALCS and swept the Bombers in three straight.

References

Further reading
Catfish: My Life in Baseball. Mcgraw-Hill by Jim "Catfish" Hunter, Armen Keteyian(April 1, 1988) 
50 Greatest Yankee Games, Fifty Greatest Yankee Games. John Wiley & Sons Inc by Cecilia Tan (04/01/2005) 
Dog Days : The New York Yankees' Fall from Grace and Return to Glory, 1964–1976. iUniverse, Incorporated – Paperback October 2000 by Philip Bashe. 
Yankees Century : 100 Years of New York Yankees Baseball. Houghton Mifflin 09/01/02 by Richard A. Johnson and Glenn Stout

External links
1976 ALCS at Baseball-Reference

American League Championship Series
American League Championship Series
New York Yankees postseason
Kansas City Royals postseason
American League Championship Series
20th century in Kansas City, Missouri
American League Championship Series
American League Championship Series
1970s in the Bronx